The 2008–09 IFA Championship (known as the Ladbrokes.com Championship for sponsorship reasons) was the first season of a major overhaul of the league system in Northern Ireland. The 2008–09 Championship consisted of one division of 17 clubs, with the clubs having intermediate status. The Championship served as the second tier of Northern Irish football for this season. With no promotion from the IFA Interim Intermediate League this season, from next season the division would be reduced to 14 clubs, with the newly introduced Championship 2 having 15.

Portadown were the champions, achieving promotion back to the top flight after only one season of absence. Donegal Celtic finished as runners-up but lost out on promotion as they were defeated on the away goals rule by Dungannon Swifts, when the Promotion/relegation play-off finished 2–2 on aggregate.

The bottom 3 clubs (Tobermore United, Dergview and Killymoon Rangers) were relegated to the newly introduced Championship 2 for next season.

League table

Interim Intermediate League
From next season, the IFA Championship would consist of two divisions, Championships 1 and 2. The IFA Interim Intermediate League was introduced as a temporary league for the 2008–09 season only, consisting of the former members of the IFA Intermediate League (dissolved in 2008) who did not meet the criteria for the new Championship 2; it consisted of 12 clubs. Members of the Interim League had one year to make improvements in order to gain entry to Championship 2 for next season.

10 of the 12 clubs managed to meet the criteria, along with Sport & Leisure Swifts and Knockbreda who both achieved intermediate status, with only Brantwood and Oxford United Stars failing to do so. Harland & Wolff Welders were the champions. There was no promotion from the Interim League which meant that Championship 1 would be reduced to 14 clubs, with Championship 2 having 15.

References

NIFL Championship seasons
North
2008–09 in Northern Ireland association football